ssipsis (birth name Eugenia T. Thompson) (June 10, 1941 – October 27, 2015) was a Penobscot poet, social worker, visual artist, writer, editor and storyteller. Much of her work was focused on and inspired by the advancement of Indigenous people.

Life

ssipsis' mother, Dorothy Phillips, was Mohawk and her father, William Thomas, was Penobscot. Her traditional name is Penobscot for "little bird". She was raised by Eugenia Mary Thomas on Indian Island where she spent most of her life. ssipsis earned a sociology degree at Colby College where she met her husband Kenneth C. Thompson. ssipsis and Kenneth had four children together.

ssipsis, a member of the Penobscot Nation, always fought for the rights of her people; most notably, she led a protest in 1970 in Old Town, Maine regarding a Penobscot treaty agreement. ssipsis is also known for her birch-bark etchings and for her work on the preservation of Penobscot art and culture. Her art often reflected her dedication to tribal rights, including hemmed pieces to make political statements. ssipsis was also the editor of the Maine Indian Newsletter, an independent publication that ran through the 1960s and 1970s and served the native peoples of Maine, along with other subscribed readers outside the local community. She typed each twenty page newsletter herself on a typewriter, often recirculating pertinent articles from local, state, and national newspapers, including many other American Indian periodicals.

Bibliography

Books
 "Molly Molasses and Me: A Collection of Living Adventures," Robin Hood Books, 1990
 "Prayers, Poems, and Pathways," Robin Hood Books, 2007.

Examples of art
Birch Bark Turtle Shell

References

External links
ssipsis video interview

1941 births
Native American novelists
Native American poets
Postmodern writers
Penobscot people
20th-century American novelists
21st-century American novelists
Native American short story writers
20th-century American poets
21st-century American poets
American women novelists
American women poets
American women short story writers
2015 deaths
20th-century American short story writers
21st-century American short story writers
20th-century American women writers
21st-century American women writers
Native American women writers
20th-century Native Americans
21st-century Native Americans
20th-century Native American women
21st-century Native American women